Miroslav Aleksić may refer to:

Miroslav Aleksić (Democratic Party of Serbia politician) (born 1954), Serbian politician
Miroslav Aleksić (People's Party politician) (born 1978), Serbian politician